Stephen Douglas Cash (May 5, 1946 – October 13, 2019) was an American musician, most notable as a founding and continual member of the rock band The Ozark Mountain Daredevils.

Biography
Born in Springfield, Missouri, Cash received his undergraduate education at the University of Missouri, where he was a member of the Zeta Phi chapter of Beta Theta Pi. He was a founding member of the Ozark Mountain Daredevils and, with the exception of a brief period away from the band in the early-1980s, remained an active member for over forty years.

In later years, Cash became a published author with his Meq trilogy (The Meq, Time Dancers and The Remembering).

Cash died on October 13, 2019.

References

External links
 The Meq on Amazon.com

1946 births
2019 deaths
Writers from Springfield, Missouri
University of Missouri alumni
American Southern Rock musicians
Musicians from Springfield, Missouri
American male novelists
Novelists from Missouri
21st-century American novelists
American male singer-songwriters
21st-century American male writers
Singer-songwriters from Missouri